Adanaspor Basketbol is a Turkish basketball club based in Adana, Turkey that plays in Turkish Basketball League (TBL). They were founded in 2006 and the municipality of Adana started to support the team in 2010. They played in the Regional League for 3 years and they promoted to the Turkish Basketball League (TBL) in 2010–2011 season. Their colors are orange and white. They also have a football team.

Players

Notable players

References

External links 

Eurobasket.com page

Sport in Adana
Basketball teams in Turkey